Melbourne City Football Club is an association football club based in Melbourne, Victoria, Australia. Founded on 12 June 2009 as Melbourne Heart Football Club, it changed names in August 2015 after being bought out by City Football Group. From its creation, the club has competed in the A-League, the first tier of soccer in Australia.

The club has won the FFA Cup once, in 2016, and were runners-up in 2019.

Melbourne City has always played home games at AAMI Park in Melbourne. The club colours and crest were altered from the original red and white colour scheme to "city blue" after the change of control in 2015. City has a longstanding rivalry with Melbourne Victory, with whom it contests the Melbourne Derby.

The following list contains all footballers who have represented their country at full international level whilst being a Melbourne City player.

Introduction
Melbourne City's first international was defender Dean Heffernan who appeared for Australia on 6 January 2010, in a 2–2 draw against Kuwait national football team in the 2011 AFC Asian Cup qualification group stage match. Australian internationals Tim Cahill and Aaron Mooy are Melbourne City's most-capped players, each appearing in 13 games for the nation while contracted to Melbourne City. Jamie Maclaren is the club's top international goalscorer, netting four times for Australia during his tenure with Melbourne City to date.

The majority of Melbourne City players that have received international caps are for Australia.

Melbourne City have had a number of players who have represented their country in major international tournaments whilst at the club.

FIFA World Cup
The first fully-fledged Melbourne City player to be selected for a FIFA World Cup was Daniel Arzani, who represented Australia in 2018.

Previously, a number of Melbourne City players had played at the World Cup immediately prior to joining the club. Michael Beauchamp had signed for the club prior to the 2010 FIFA World Cup, and made one appearance for Australia at the tournament before joining Melbourne. Similarly, David Villa was announced as joining Melbourne on loan from New York City before representing Spain at the 2014 tournament.

Continental tournaments
Aaron Hughes was confirmed to be leaving Melbourne City in April 2016, and went on to represent Northern Ireland immediately afterwards at Euro 2016.

List of players
 Key
 Players are initially arranged by alphabetical order of surname.
 Appearances as a substitute are included.
 International years indicates the year of the player's first and last caps while a Melbourne City player. Caps included are for the number won by the player during his time with Melbourne City and may not be the full total of the player's career.
 Statistics are correct as of 6 April 2022.

Notes

References

Internationals
Melbourne City FC Internationals
Association football player non-biographical articles
Melbourne